Pacifastacus is a genus of crayfish native to western North America (USA and Canada), containing six species, two of which are extinct:
†Pacifastacus chenoderma (fossil: Miocene – Pliocene)
Pacifastacus connectens
Pacifastacus fortis – Shasta crayfish
Pacifastacus gambelii
Pacifastacus leniusculus – signal crayfish
†Pacifastacus nigrescens – Sooty crayfish

References

Astacidae
Crustacean genera